Gettin' Down On It is the first full-length album by the Fort Wayne, Indiana, blues rock duo Left Lane Cruiser. The album was released through Hillgrass Bluebilly on July 26, 2006 and re-released on February 26, 2007.

Track listing

References

External links 
 
 

2006 debut albums
Left Lane Cruiser albums